Rearmament is the third album by American singer-songwriter Happy Rhodes, released in 1986.

Overview
Rhodes' first four albums were not conceived and recorded as album releases, but were a gathering together of songs recorded at Cathedral Sound Studios from 1984 to 1986. When fellow musician Kevin Bartlett offered to release the songs on his cassette-only personal label Aural Gratification, Rhodes culled through the songs she had recorded and ordered them to her satisfaction.

Originally released as a cassette tape, each copy sold was a 1 to 1 real-time dub. Rearmament was released on CD in 1992 with additional tracks.

Track listing
All music, lyrics, voices, instruments and arrangements by Happy Rhodes.
"Perfect Irony" – 3:59
"For We Believe" – 2:46
"I Am a Legend" – 4:05
"'Til the Dawn Breaks" – 5:53
"The Issue Is" – 3:21
"Friend You'll Be" – 3:36
"Dreams Are" – 5:41
"Box H.A.P." – 3:01
"I Have a Heart" – 4:41
"Crystal Orbs" – 3:41
"Because I Learn" – 3:39
"Baby Don't Go" – 4:10
"Rhodes Waltz" – 2:36
"Ally, Ally Oxen Free" – 5:40
"Be Careful What You Say" – 5:35

Personnel
 Happy Rhodes: vocals, guitar, keyboards

1986 albums
Happy Rhodes albums